Sullivan High School is a public high school located in Sullivan, Indiana. SHS is one of three high schools in Sullivan County (the other two being North Central High School in Farmersburg and Union High School in Dugger). Sullivan High School is also the only secondary institution under the administration of the Southwest School Corporation.

Demographics
The school's racial makeup is 72% Caucasian, 28% Hispanic, and 0% Multiracial. 45% of students receive free lunch, and 5% are on reduced-price lunch.

Academics
The school competes in Academic Super Bowl, Knowledge Masters Open, Quiz Bowl, Science Olympiad, and Spell Bowl competitions. Many of the teams compete in Western Indiana Conference competitions.

Fine arts
Sullivan High School's fine arts program is basic.  Classes are offered in 2-D and a class in 3-D art is available. The music program is split into two performing categories: instrumental band (which also functions as the school's marching band and winter pep band), and vocal, which includes chorus and Golden Arrow Singers, and the school's advanced chorus.

Athletics
Sullivan High School offers Baseball, Softball, Boys Basketball, Girls Basketball, Cheerleading, Boys Cross Country, Girls Cross Country, Football, Golf, Soccer, Boys Track, Girls Track, Volleyball, and Wrestling.

Clubs
Student clubs at Sullivan High School include Beta Club, National Honor Society, Spanish Club, Green Alliance, FCA (Fellowship of Christian athletes), Upward Bound, Chess Club, FCCLA, Key Club, FFA, Student Council, Tech Treck, JAG, and Super Mileage Team.

See also
 List of high schools in Indiana

References

External links
Sullivan High School's Website
School Data

Public high schools in Indiana
Former Southern Indiana Athletic Conference members
Schools in Sullivan County, Indiana
1883 establishments in Indiana